John Charles Jamieson Stoke (1928–2000) was Director of Public Health in New Zealand from 1986 to 1987.

Early life and education 
Stoke was born on 14 August 1928, in Leigh-on-Sea, in Essex, England. Stoke's father was the son of Polish immigrants who came to England under a church sponsorship in the 1880s. His mother was the daughter of a Scottish marine engineer. His parents met (in London) through church activities and married in 1918.

When World War 2 broke out, the family had to move from Essex for safety reasons to Surrey. Stoke gained a scholarship and went to school at the King Edward 6th Grammar School in Guildford. In 1943, the family returned to Leigh-on-Sea, and Stoke attended the local grammar school in Westcliff. He passed his matriculation exam in 1944 with distinction in history, Latin, and maths.

In 1946, Stoke was accepted for medical training at St Bartholomew's Hospital in London.

The Zimbabwe years 
After graduating from medical school, Stoke did "house appointments" in hospitals from 1952-1953.  He became a Surgeon Lieutenant in the Royal Navy and served there from 1953-1957. During this time Stoke met Bernice and they were married in 1954.

In 1958, the family moved to Southern Rhodesia). Stoke initially worked as a general practitioner in rural areas. During this time he became involved in leprosy work. He trained locals in leprosy treatment, with the result that leper colonies in the area became unnecessary.

After a period as a general practitioner in Salisbury (Salisbury), Stoke became Senior Medical Officer in the Royal Rhodesian Air Force, and the family moved to (Gwelo). It was during this time that he developed his interest in Occupational and Preventive Medicine.

In 1969 the family returned to Salisbury, and Stoke became a lecturer in Preventive Medicine at the University of Rhodesia, where he worked until 1976. In 1975 he returned to England on sabbatical, and did post-graduate work in Occupational Medicine. During this time the political situation in Rhodesia was deteriorating. Faced with the prospect that his elder sons would soon be drafted into the Rhodesian army, Stoke decided to migrate. After applying for several positions around the world, he was offered a position in New Zealand.

The New Zealand years 
In 1976, the family migrated to New Zealand, leaving behind the two eldest boys to complete their university studies – Mike in Cape Town and Alan in Salisbury. They settled in Paraparaumu. Stoke initially was Senior Medical Officer with the Ministry of Transport, and then joined the Ministry of Health, with responsibility for Occupational Health.

In 1981 Stoke undertook a World Health Organization (WHO)) fellowship, studying the effect of political and socioeconomic systems on occupational health. The four-month fellowship included visits to Canada, USA, Ireland, United Kingdom, the USSR and Sweden.

In 1986 Stoke was appointed Director of Public Health in New Zealand. During this time he also did some lecturing in community health at the Wellington branch of Otago Medical School, and was active in the Asia/Pacific branch of the WHO.

In 1987, complications from cataract surgery resulted in Stoke's retirement from the Ministry of Health. After some months of convalescence, his vision improved sufficiently for him to work again, and he was appointed co-ordinator of the Occupational Health Task Force of the National Health Institute. Stoke retired again in 1989. John's work with the World Health Organization continued after his retirement. He undertook assignments in the Western Pacific, China, Vietnam and Papua New Guinea.

Stoke died on 27 July 2000, in Auckland.

In 2001 ANZSOM (NZ)  - The Australia & New Zealand Society of Occupational Medicine inaugurated the John Stoke Medal in his honour, as a way of recognising special contributions to occupational medicine by one of its members.

Tertiary education

Positions held

Appointments

Societies

Publications, awards and citations 
During his lifetime, Stoke published many papers and articles in a wide variety of journals, and gained a number of awards. Among these is one called the Purkinje Medal from the Czechoslovakian Medical Academy; the citation on the certificate accompanying this is in Latin so the circumstances under which he was awarded this are not known.

Publications in refereed journals

Publications in other journals

Co-author or citation 
The public health implications of growth promoters in food (co-author with John Reeve)
Cited as a member of the Asbestos Advisory Committee (Convenor, Management and Disposal of Asbestos Working Party) in Report of the Asbestos Advisory Committee to the Minister of Labour, April 1991, and in Asbestos exposure and disease – notes for medical practitioners, July 1995
Acknowledged in Occupational Overuse Syndrome, Treatment and Rehabilitation – A Practitioner's Guide
He also contributed to many pamphlets issued by the New Zealand Department of Health, relating to occupational health matters.

References 

New Zealand occupational health practitioners
People from Paraparaumu
1928 births
2000 deaths